Canoeing at the 2024 Summer Olympics in Paris are scheduled to run across two main disciplines: canoe slalom, to take place from 27 July to 5 August, and canoe sprint, from 6 to 10 August. Both canoe slalom and sprint events will be staged at the National Olympic Nautical Stadium of Île-de-France in Vaires-sur-Marne.

Similar to the previous editions, the competition will feature sixteen events with several significant changes to the program lineup. The men's C-2 and K-2 1000 metres will be replaced with half of its distance, the men's C-2 and K-2 500 metres, to align with the women's side of the program. Paris 2024 will also signify the debut of the men's and women's slalom kayak cross event, as part of the Olympic movement toward gender equality, substituting the men's and women's K-1 200-metre sprint races.

Qualification

The International Olympic Committee and the International Canoe Federation have released a new qualification system for both slalom and sprint canoeing at the 2024 Summer Olympics.

Competition schedule

Medal summary

Medal table

Slalom

Sprint
Men

Women

See also
Canoeing at the 2022 Asian Games
Canoeing at the 2023 Pan American Games

References

 
Canoeing and kayaking competitions in France
Canoeing at the Summer Olympics
2024 Summer Olympics events
2024 in canoeing